The 2015 ECAC Hockey Men's Ice Hockey Tournament was the 54th tournament in league history. It was played between March 6 and March 21, 2015. First Round and Quarterfinal games were played at home team campus sites, while the final four games were played at the Herb Brooks Arena in Lake Placid, New York. By winning the tournament, the Harvard Crimson received the ECAC's automatic bid to the 2015 NCAA Division I Men's Ice Hockey Tournament.

Format
The tournament featured four rounds of play. The teams that finished above fifth place in the standings received a bye to the quarterfinal round. In the first round, the fifth and twelfth seeds, the sixth and eleventh seeds, the seventh and tenth seeds and the eighth and ninth seeds played a best-of-three series with the winners advancing to the quarterfinals. In the quarterfinals the one seed played the lowest remaining seed, the second seed played the second-lowest remaining seed, the third seed played the third-lowest remaining seed and the fourth seed played the fourth-lowest remaining seed another best-of-three series with the winners of these the series advanced to the Semifinals. In the semifinals the top remaining seed played the lowest remaining seed while the two remaining teams played against each other. The winners of the semifinals played in the championship game while the losers played in a third-place game. All series after the quarterfinals were single-elimination games. The tournament champion received an automatic bid to the 2015 NCAA Division I Men's Ice Hockey Tournament.

Conference standings
Note: GP = Games played; W = Wins; L = Losses; T = Ties; PTS = Points; GF = Goals For; GA = Goals Against

Bracket
Teams are reseeded after the First Round and Quarterfinals

Note: * denotes overtime period(s)

Results

First round

(5) Dartmouth vs. (12) Princeton

(6) Harvard vs. (11) Brown

(7) Cornell vs. (10) Union

(8) Clarkson vs. (9) Rensselaer

Quarterfinals

(1) Quinnipiac vs. (10) Union

(2) St. Lawrence vs. (9) Rensselaer

(3) Yale vs. (6) Harvard

(4) Colgate vs. (5) Dartmouth

Semifinals

(1) Quinnipiac vs. (6) Harvard

(2) St. Lawrence vs. (4) Colgate

Championship

(4) Colgate vs. (6) Harvard

Tournament awards

All-Tournament Team
F Jimmy Vesey* (Harvard)
F Mike Borkowski (Colgate)
F Darcy Murphy (Colgate)
D Spiro Goulakos (Colgate)
D Patrick McNally (Harvard)
G Steve Michalek (Harvard)
* Most Outstanding Player(s)

References

ECAC Tournament
ECAC Hockey Men's Ice Hockey Tournament
Sports in Lake Placid, New York
Ice hockey in New York (state)
College sports in New York (state)
ECAC Hockey Men's Ice Hockey